In five-dimensional geometry, a stericated 5-simplex is a convex uniform 5-polytope with fourth-order truncations (sterication) of the regular 5-simplex.

There are six unique sterications of the 5-simplex, including permutations of truncations, cantellations, and runcinations. The simplest stericated 5-simplex is also called an expanded 5-simplex, with the first and last nodes ringed, for being constructible by an expansion operation applied to the regular 5-simplex. The highest form, the steriruncicantitruncated 5-simplex is more simply called an omnitruncated 5-simplex with all of the nodes ringed.

Stericated 5-simplex 

A stericated 5-simplex can be constructed by an expansion operation applied to the regular 5-simplex, and thus is also sometimes called an expanded 5-simplex. It has 30 vertices, 120 edges, 210 faces (120 triangles and 90 squares), 180 cells (60 tetrahedra and 120 triangular prisms) and 62 4-faces (12 5-cells, 30 tetrahedral prisms and 20 3-3 duoprisms).

Alternate names 
 Expanded 5-simplex
 Stericated hexateron
 Small cellated dodecateron (Acronym: scad) (Jonathan Bowers)

Cross-sections

The maximal cross-section of the stericated hexateron with a 4-dimensional hyperplane is a runcinated 5-cell. This cross-section divides the stericated hexateron into two pentachoral hypercupolas consisting of 6 5-cells, 15 tetrahedral prisms and 10 3-3 duoprisms each.

Coordinates 

The vertices of the stericated 5-simplex can be constructed on a hyperplane in 6-space as permutations of (0,1,1,1,1,2). This represents the positive orthant facet of the stericated 6-orthoplex.

A second construction in 6-space, from the center of a rectified 6-orthoplex is given by coordinate permutations of:
 (1,-1,0,0,0,0)

The Cartesian coordinates in 5-space for the normalized vertices of an origin-centered stericated hexateron are:

Root system 
Its 30 vertices represent the root vectors of the simple Lie group A5. It is also the vertex figure of the 5-simplex honeycomb.

Images

Steritruncated 5-simplex

Alternate names 
 Steritruncated hexateron
 Celliprismated hexateron (Acronym: cappix) (Jonathan Bowers)

Coordinates 
The coordinates can be made in 6-space, as 180 permutations of:
 (0,1,1,1,2,3)

This construction exists as one of 64 orthant facets of the steritruncated 6-orthoplex.

Images

Stericantellated 5-simplex

Alternate names 
 Stericantellated hexateron
 Cellirhombated dodecateron (Acronym: card) (Jonathan Bowers)

Coordinates 
The coordinates can be made in 6-space, as permutations of:
 (0,1,1,2,2,3)

This construction exists as one of 64 orthant facets of the stericantellated 6-orthoplex.

Images

Stericantitruncated 5-simplex

Alternate names 
 Stericantitruncated hexateron
 Celligreatorhombated hexateron (Acronym: cograx) (Jonathan Bowers)

Coordinates 
The coordinates can be made in 6-space, as 360 permutations of:
 (0,1,1,2,3,4)

This construction exists as one of 64 orthant facets of the stericantitruncated 6-orthoplex.

Images

Steriruncitruncated 5-simplex

Alternate names 
 Steriruncitruncated hexateron
 Celliprismatotruncated dodecateron (Acronym: captid) (Jonathan Bowers)

Coordinates 
The coordinates can be made in 6-space, as 360 permutations of:
 (0,1,2,2,3,4)

This construction exists as one of 64 orthant facets of the steriruncitruncated 6-orthoplex.

Images

Omnitruncated 5-simplex 

The omnitruncated 5-simplex has 720 vertices, 1800 edges, 1560 faces (480 hexagons and 1080 squares), 540 cells (360 truncated octahedra, 90 cubes, and 90 hexagonal prisms), and 62 4-faces (12 omnitruncated 5-cells, 30 truncated octahedral prisms, and 20 6-6 duoprisms).

Alternate names 
 Steriruncicantitruncated 5-simplex (Full description of omnitruncation for 5-polytopes by Johnson)
 Omnitruncated hexateron
 Great cellated dodecateron (Acronym: gocad) (Jonathan Bowers)

Coordinates 
The vertices of the omnitruncated 5-simplex can be most simply constructed on a hyperplane in 6-space as permutations of (0,1,2,3,4,5). These coordinates come from the positive orthant facet of the steriruncicantitruncated 6-orthoplex, t0,1,2,3,4{34,4}, .

Images

Permutohedron 

The omnitruncated 5-simplex is the permutohedron of order 6. It is also a zonotope, the Minkowski sum of six line segments parallel to the six lines through the origin and the six vertices of the 5-simplex.

Related honeycomb 
The omnitruncated 5-simplex honeycomb is constructed by omnitruncated 5-simplex facets with 3 facets around each ridge.

Full snub 5-simplex 

The full snub 5-simplex or omnisnub 5-simplex, defined as an alternation of the omnitruncated 5-simplex is not uniform, but it can be given Coxeter diagram  and symmetry +, and constructed from 12 snub 5-cells, 30 snub tetrahedral antiprisms, 20 3-3 duoantiprisms, and 360 irregular 5-cells filling the gaps at the deleted vertices.

Related uniform polytopes 

These polytopes are a part of 19 uniform 5-polytopes based on the [3,3,3,3] Coxeter group, all shown here in A5 Coxeter plane orthographic projections. (Vertices are colored by projection overlap order, red, orange, yellow, green, cyan, blue, purple having progressively more vertices)

Notes

References 
 H.S.M. Coxeter: 
 H.S.M. Coxeter, Regular Polytopes, 3rd Edition, Dover New York, 1973 
 Kaleidoscopes: Selected Writings of H.S.M. Coxeter, edited by F. Arthur Sherk, Peter McMullen, Anthony C. Thompson, Asia Ivic Weiss, Wiley-Interscience Publication, 1995,  
 (Paper 22) H.S.M. Coxeter, Regular and Semi Regular Polytopes I, [Math. Zeit. 46 (1940) 380-407, MR 2,10]
 (Paper 23) H.S.M. Coxeter, Regular and Semi-Regular Polytopes II, [Math. Zeit. 188 (1985) 559-591]
 (Paper 24) H.S.M. Coxeter, Regular and Semi-Regular Polytopes III, [Math. Zeit. 200 (1988) 3-45]
 Norman Johnson Uniform Polytopes, Manuscript (1991)
 N.W. Johnson: The Theory of Uniform Polytopes and Honeycombs, Ph.D. 
  x3o3o3o3x - scad, x3x3o3o3x - cappix, x3o3x3o3x - card, x3x3x3o3x - cograx, x3x3o3x3x - captid, x3x3x3x3x - gocad

External links 
 
 Polytopes of Various Dimensions
 Multi-dimensional Glossary

5-polytopes